Dolenje is a village on the left bank of the Vipava River in the Municipality of Ajdovščina in the Littoral region of Slovenia.

Landmarks

Church
The local church is dedicated to Saint Margaret and belongs to the Parish of Planina.

Stone arch bridge

A stone arch bridge over the Vipava River links Dolenje to the village of Dolga Poljana. The three-arch bridge was built in the 19th century. It is paved with gravel and supported by buttresses that are reinforced with groynes on the upstream side. There is a low stone wall on both sides of the bridge, and a shrine with a semi-circular niche once stood at it.

References

External links 

Dolenje on Geopedia.si (map, aerial view)
Dolenje on Google Maps (map, photographs, street view)

Populated places in the Municipality of Ajdovščina
Arch bridges in Slovenia